This is a list of television shows set in London.

 2point4 Children - Chiswick 
 Absolute Power
 Absolutely Fabulous
 The Adventures of Sherlock Holmes
 Are You Being Served?
 As If
 As Time Goes By - Holland Park
 Ashes to Ashes
 The Avengers and The New Avengers
 Babes in the Wood - St John's Wood
 Bad Girls - HMP Larkhall (fictional), South London
 Between the Lines
 Big Deal
 The Bill - London borough of Canley (fictional)
 The Black Adder, Blackadder II, Blackadder the Third (but not Blackadder Goes Forth)
 Black Books - Bloomsbury
 Bless This House - Putney
 Bottom - Hammersmith
 Bridgerton
 Brush Strokes - Motspur Park
 The Buddha of Suburbia
 Bugs - Docklands
 Call the Midwife
 Capital City
 Citizen Smith - Tooting
 Crapston Villas - fictional postcode of SE69
 The Crown Danger Mouse Desmond's - Peckham
 Dixon of Dock Green Doctor Who — numerous episodes, most notably "Rose", "Aliens of London" and "The Christmas Invasion"; also classic serials "An Unearthly Child" (Shoreditch), "The Dalek Invasion of Earth", "The War Machines", "The Talons of Weng-Chiang" and "Survival" (Perivale) 
 Drop the Dead Donkey The Duchess of Duke Street EastEnders - London borough of Walford (fictional)
 Family Affairs - London borough of Charnham (fictional) (from 1999 until 2005)
 Footballers' Wives Friday Night Dinner - Mill Hill
 Garrow's Law George and Mildred - Hampton Wick
 Gimme Gimme Gimme - Camden
 Giri/Haji - "Duty/Shame" (2019)
 The Gnomes of Dulwich - Dulwich
 The Goodies - Cricklewood
 The Good Life - Surbiton (suburb)
 Goodnight Sweetheart set in Cricklewood of the 1990s, with time travel back to World War II
 Grange Hill - east London (up until 2003)
 Hancock's Half Hour - Cheam
 Hardware Hotel Babylon The House of Cards trilogy - Westminster
 Hustle The Inbetweeners The I.T. Crowd Jeeves and Wooster - Berkeley Square, Mayfair W1 area mostly
 Keen Eddie The Kumars at No. 42 - Wembley
 The Last Detective - Willesden
 Law & Order: UK Lead Balloon London's Burning - Blackwall
 London Bridge Lucy in London Luther Marcella (2016 - now)
 May to December - Pinner
 Men Behaving Badly Metrosexuality - Notting Hill
 The Mighty Boosh Minder Mongrels - Isle of Dogs
 My Family - Chiswick
 My Hero - Northolt
 Nathan Barley - Shoreditch
 Neverwhere - "London Below", a fictional realm co-existing with London
 The New Statesman - Whitehall
 New Tricks Not Going Out NY-LON One Foot in the Grave - though most location shots were filmed in Bournemouth
 Only Fools and Horses - Peckham
 'Orrible Orson and Olivia 
 Paddington Bear Peep Show Penny Crayon Penny Dreadful PhoneShop - Sutton
 Porkpie - Peckham
 Pulling - Penge
 Pure (British TV series) The Professionals QB VII Rentaghost - Ealing
 Ripper Street River (2015)
 Rumpole of the Bailey Secret Diary of a Call Girl Sherlock (2011)
 Skins - Series 7 episodes "Skins Fire" and "Skins Pure" were set in London
 Some Mothers Do 'Ave 'Em Spaced - Tufnell Park
 Spooks Spotless Stath Lets Flats - Edgware
 Steptoe and Son - Shepherd's Bush
 The Chelsea Detective The Sweeney Terry and June - Purley, London Borough of Croydon
 The Thick of It - Westminster
 The Thin Blue Line - London borough of Gasforth (fictional)
 This Life - South London
 The Tomorrow People 
 Tony Bennett at the Talk of the Town Top Boy Trust - City of London
 Upstairs, Downstairs - London townhouse of the Bellamy family at 165 Eaton Place
 Upstart Crow - Central London
 W1A - the London postal district of the BBC HQ.
 Waking The Dead Whitechapel William and Mary The Wombles - Wimbledon
 Yes Minister and Yes, Prime Minister - Whitehall
 The Young Ones - North London

Miniseries, specials or individual episodesScooby-Doo, Where Are You! "What a Night for a Knight"Ben 10: Omniverse "An American Benwolf in London"
 The Legend of Tarzan ""The Hidden World"Totally Spies!"Totally Dunzo"Transformers: The Headmasters"Terror! The Six Shadows"Danger Rangers"Water Works"
"Chem Gems"Scooby-Doo and Guess Who?"Elementary, My Dear Shaggy!"Doki
"Happy New Year... Again!"

See also 

 List of films set in London

London
 
Television